Gypsonictops is an extinct genus of leptictidan mammals of the monotypic family Gypsonictopidae, which was described in 1927 by George Gaylord Simpson. Species in this genus were small mammals and the first representatives of the order Leptictida, that appeared during the Upper Cretaceous.

The genus is thought to have gone extinct before the Cenozoic began, but there are indications that it may have survived into the early Paleocene. Fossils have been found in the United States, Belgium, and Uzbekistan.  

Like Cimolestes or Daulestes, it is possible that they had some distant relationship with the ungulates.   It is one of the few eutherians that existed in North America during the Campanian, a period in which the multituberculates and the metatherians were the dominant ones on the continent.

Physiology 
Like other  prehistoric mammals of the Upper Cretaceous in North America, Gypsonictops had a particular dentition, with five premolars double-rooted in the lower jaw, while the vast majority of mammals only had four. On the other hand, the five premolars also were a very typical feature of the most primitive eutherians.

In the same way as the species of the genus Leptictidium, the P4 premolar was highly molarized, which caused confusion when analyzing a specimen of G. petersoni between P4 and molar M1. Eventually, P4 was found to be a paraconid-free premolar.

It is known that the Gypsonictops were eutherians and that they could be placentals, as they show very typical characteristics of these animals, although they belong to the Leptictida group, which includes some of the few non-placental eutherians that existed. Furthermore, the line between placental and non-placental eutherians is very thin, so the classification of Gypsonictops with precision is a very complicated task.

Taxonomy 
The genus Gypsonictops was first classified within the family Leptictidae, by Simpson, along with all Leptictida of North America. This classification was maintained until 1967, year in which Leigh Van Valen created the family Gypsonictopidae for this genus especially. In 1997, Malcolm C. McKenna and Susan K. Bell suggested the possibility that this family contained up to seven different genera, but documents published since then have shown a high degree of skepticism about the proposal.

Species 

The genus Gypsonictops contains six species:

Gypsonictops clemensi 
Described by J. K. Rigby and D. L. Wolberg in 1987. It inhabited the planet during the Campanian and Maastrichtian periods. Its description was made from a molar M3 found in New Mexico. The name of the species is dedicated to the American paleontologist William A. Clemens.

Gypsonictops dormaalensis 
Described by G. E. Quinet in 1964. The name of the species refers to the  Belgian population of Dormaal, a city in which there is an important fossil deposit in which fossils of G. dormaalensis.

Gypsonictops hypoconus 
Described by G. G. Simpson in 1927. It lived during the Campanian and Maastrichtian periods, and fossils have been found in the Hell Creek Formation and other sites in the United States.   When  Simpson  created the genus Gypsonictops to define this species, placed it within the family Leptictidae, which was then part of the Insectivara order, now obsolete. The name of the species refers to its hypocone, the lower cusp of the molar teeth.

Gypsonictops illuminatus 
Described by J. A. Lillegraven in 1969. It inhabited Earth during the Maastrichtian, and fossils have been found in the Hell Creek Formation, in the United States, as well as in various paleontological sites in Canada.

Gypsonictops lewisi 
Described by A. Sahni in 1972. It lived during the Campanian. Fossils of the species have been found in the Judith River Formation, Montana. G. lewisi is one of the species with more typical characteristics of the placental s of the genus, such as the fusion of a small metaconid with a long protoconid, or a small talonid with two cusps. On the other hand, the premolar es are not as molarized as in other species of the genus. They usually used to weigh over fifty gram s. The species name is dedicated to the Captain Meriwether Lewis, a celebrated American explorer.

Gypsonictops petersoni 
Described in 1929 by G. G. Simpson, who named the species "Euangelistes petersoni" and wrongly classified it within the infraclass Marsupialia. It is known with certainty that they inhabited the planet during the Maastrichtian, but it is possible that they could have survived the Cretaceous-Paleogene mass extinction and lived until the Danian. The holotype of this species is in the Carnegie Museum of Natural History and it is a lower jaw that had been badly damaged. Another specimen, preserved at Yale University, has been described by up to five different names. In case there was not enough controversy on the subject, in 1973, Clemens stated that G. petersoni was the same species as G. hypoconus.

Bibliography

References

External links 
 "American Cretaceous Insectivares", by George Gaylord Simpson

Leptictids
Prehistoric mammal genera
Late Cretaceous mammals of Asia
Late Cretaceous mammals of North America
Cretaceous mammals of Europe
Fossil taxa described in 1927